Y Drych Cristianogawl (The Christian Mirror) is a Welsh publication from the 16th century and the first book to have been printed in Wales.

Whilst Y Drych Cristianogawl was not the first book to be printed in Welsh, it was the first book to be printed in Wales. During parts of the sixteenth century the printing of Roman Catholic books was prohibited in Wales, and as a result, most Catholic works were distributed in manuscript form. Y Drych Cristianogawl was successfully formed through secret presses and the first part was printed by Roger Thackwell in Rhiwledin cave, on the Little Orme, near Llandudno in early 1587. The latter parts were not printed due to government intervention, but have survived in manuscript form.

Four original copies survive, of which the only perfect copy is held by the National Library of Wales.

See also
Yny lhyvyr hwnn - The first book to be printed in the Welsh language

References

External links 
 Digitised text on the University of Michigan Library website

16th-century books
Welsh literature
National Library of Wales collections